This is a list of animation feature films awards. It is a collection of films that have been awarded the Best (Animated) Feature awards in various awards and festivals.

Awards

North America

Nation-wide associations

|-

|- 
! Saturn Awards || Golden Reel Awards || Annies || Satellite Awards || OFTA Awards  || Critics' Choice || National Board of Review || OFCS Awards || Oscars || Hollywood Awards || People's Choice || Kids' Choice || Producers Guild of America Award || Golden Globes || EDA Awards || Eddies || Seattle Film Critics Society 
|-
| Watership Down
|-
| The Secret of NIMH
|-
| || Oliver & Company
|-
| || The Little Mermaid
|-
| || The Rescuers Down Under
|-
| || Beauty and the Beast 
|-
| || Aladdin || Beauty and the Beast
|-
| || Once Upon a Forest || Aladdin
|-
| || The Lion King || The Lion King
|-
| || Toy Story || Pocahontas
|-
| || The Hunchback of Notre Dame || Toy Story || The Hunchback of Notre Dame
|-
| || Hercules || Cats Don't Dance || || Anastasia
|-
| || A Bug's Life || Mulan || A Bug's Life || || A Bug's Life + The Prince of Egypt
|-
| || The Iron Giant || The Iron Giant || Toy Story 2 || The Iron Giant || Toy Story 2
|-
| || Titan A.E. || Toy Story 2 || Chicken Run || Chicken Run || Chicken Run || Chicken Run
|-
| || Atlantis: The Lost Empire || Shrek || || Shrek || Shrek || Shrek || Shrek || Shrek
|-
| Spirited Away || Treasure Planet || Spirited Away || Spirited Away || Spirited Away || Spirited Away || Spirited Away || Spirited Away || Spirited Away
|-
| Finding Nemo || Finding Nemo || Finding Nemo || The Triplets of Belleville || Finding Nemo || Finding Nemo || Finding Nemo || Finding Nemo || Finding Nemo || Finding Nemo 
|-
| The Incredibles || The Incredibles || The Incredibles || The Incredibles || The Incredibles || The Incredibles || The Incredibles || The Incredibles || The Incredibles || Shrek 2 || Shrek 2
|-
| Corpse Bride || The Curse of the Were-Rabbit || The Curse of the Were-Rabbit || || The Curse of the Were-Rabbit || The Curse of the Were-Rabbit || Corpse Bride || The Curse of the Were-Rabbit || The Curse of the Were-Rabbit || Howl's Moving Castle || || Madagascar || The Curse of the Were-Rabbit
|-
| Cars || Cars || Cars || || Monster House || Cars || Cars || A Scanner Darkly || Happy Feet || Cars || Cars || Happy Feet || Cars || Cars
|-
| Ratatouille || Ratatouille || Ratatouille || Ratatouille || Ratatouille || Ratatouille || Ratatouille || Ratatouille || Ratatouille || Ratatouille || Shrek the Third || Ratatouille || Ratatouille || Ratatouille
|-
| Wall·E || Wall·E || Kung Fu Panda || Wall·E || Wall·E || Wall·E || Wall·E || Wall·E || Wall·E || Wall·E || Wall·E || Madagascar: Escape 2 Africa || Wall·E || Wall·E
|-
| Monsters vs. Aliens || Up || Up || Fantastic Mr. Fox || Up || Up || Up || Up || Up || || Up || Up || Up || Up || Up
|- 
| Toy Story 3 || How to Train Your Dragon || How to Train Your Dragon || Toy Story 3 || Toy Story 3 || Toy Story 3 || Toy Story 3 || Toy Story 3 || Toy Story 3 || Toy Story 3 || Toy Story 3 || Despicable Me || Toy Story 3 || Toy Story 3 || Toy Story 3 || Toy Story 3
|-
| Puss in Boots || The Secret of the Unicorn || Rango || The Secret of the Unicorn || Rango + The Secret of the Unicorn || Rango || Rango || Rango || Rango || Rango || Cars 2 || Puss in Boots || The Secret of the Unicorn || The Secret of the Unicorn || Rango || Rango
|-
| Frankenweenie || Wreck-It Ralph || Wreck-It Ralph || Rise of the Guardians || Wreck-It Ralph || Wreck-It Ralph || Wreck-It Ralph || ParaNorman || Brave || Rise of the Guardians || Wreck-It Ralph || Wreck-It Ralph || Wreck-It Ralph || Brave || ParaNorman || Brave
|-
| Frozen || Epic || Frozen || The Wind Rises || Frozen || Frozen || The Wind Rises || The Wind Rises || Frozen || Monsters University || Despicable Me 2 || Frozen || Frozen || Frozen || The Wind Rises || Frozen
|-
| The Lego Movie || Big Hero 6 || How to Train Your Dragon 2 || Song of the Sea || The Lego Movie || The Lego Movie || How to Train Your Dragon 2 || The Lego Movie || Big Hero 6 || How to Train Your Dragon 2 || || Big Hero 6 || The Lego Movie || How to Train Your Dragon 2 || The Lego Movie || The Lego Movie
|-
| Inside Out || Inside Out || Inside Out || Inside Out || Inside Out || Inside Out || Inside Out || Inside Out || Inside Out || Inside Out || Minions || Hotel Transylvania 2 || Inside Out || Inside Out || Inside Out || Inside Out
|-
| Finding Dory || Moana || Zootopia || My Life as a Courgette || Kubo and the Two Strings || Zootopia || Kubo and the Two Strings || Kubo and the Two Strings || Zootopia || Zootopia || Finding Dory || Finding Dory || Zootopia || Zootopia || Zootopia || Zootopia || Zootopia
|-
| Coco || Coco || Coco || Coco || Coco + Loving Vincent || Coco || Coco || Coco || Coco || Coco || || Coco || Coco || Coco || Coco || Coco || Coco
|-
| Spider-Man: Into the Spider-Verse || Spider-Man: Into the Spider-Verse || Spider-Man: Into the Spider-Verse || Isle of Dogs || Spider-Man: Into the Spider-Verse || Spider-Man: Into the Spider-Verse || Incredibles 2 || Spider-Man: Into the Spider-Verse || Spider-Man: Into the Spider-Verse || Incredibles 2 || Incredibles 2 || Incredibles 2 || Spider-Man: Into the Spider-Verse || Spider-Man: Into the Spider-Verse || Spider-Man: Into the Spider-Verse || Spider-Man: Into the Spider-Verse || Spider-Man: Into the Spider-Verse
|-
| || Toy Story 4 || Klaus || The Lion King || Toy Story 4 || Toy Story 4 || How to Train Your Dragon: The Hidden World || Toy Story 4 || Toy Story 4 || Toy Story 4 || || Frozen II || Toy Story 4 || Missing Link || I Lost My Body || Toy Story 4 || Toy Story 4
|-
| Onward || Soul || Soul || Wolfwalkers || Soul || || Soul || Soul || Soul || || Onward || Soul || Soul ||Soul || Soul || Soul || Wolfwalkers
|-
| Marcel the Shell with Shoes On || Raya and the Last Dragon || The Mitchells vs. the Machines || Encanto || The Mitchells vs. the Machines || The Mitchells vs. the Machines|| Encanto || The Mitchells vs. the Machines || Encanto || || Luca || Encanto || Encanto || Encanto || The Mitchells vs. the Machines || Encanto || Flee
|-
| Marcel the Shell with Shoes On || Guillermo del Toro's Pinocchio || Guillermo del Toro's Pinocchio || Marcel the Shell with Shoes On || Pinocchio || Pinocchio || Marcel the Shell with Shoes On || Pinocchio || Pinocchio || || || Minions: The Rise of Gru||  Pinocchio|| Pinocchio || Pinocchio  || Pinocchio || Marcel the Shell with Shoes On
|-
! colspan=19|Number of awards by animation studio
|-
! Saturn Awards || Golden Reel Awards || Annies || Satellite Award || OFTA Awards || Critics' Choice || National Board of Review || OFCS Awards || Oscars || Hollywood Awards || People's Choice || Kids' Choice || Producers Guild || Golden Globes || EDA Awards || Eddies || Seattle Film Critics Society 
|-
| 9 Pixar (2003–2020)  2 Burton (2005–2012)  2 DreamWorks (2009–2011)  1 Nepenthe (1978)  1 Bluth (1982)  1 Ghibli (2002)  2 Disney (2013-2016)  1 Animal Logic (2014)  1 Warner Bros. (2014)  1 Sony Pictures (2018)  1 A24 (2022)  || 14 Disney (1988-2021)  12 Pixar (1995-2020)  2 Fox (2000–2013)  2 DreamWorks (2005–2010)  1 Hanna-Barbera (1993)  1 Warner Bros. (1999)  1 Nickelodeon (2011)  1 Weta (2011)  1 Blue Sky (2013)  1 Sony Pictures (2018)     || 11 Pixar (1996-2020)  7 Disney (1992-2013)  5 DreamWorks (2001–2014)  2 Warner Bros. (1997–1999)  1 Ghibli (2002)  1 Aardman (2005)  1 Nickelodeon (2011)  2 Sony Pictures (2018-2021)  1 Netflix Animation (2019)         || 7 Pixar (1998-2015)  2 Ghibli (2002–2013)  2 Disney (1996-2021)  1 Aardman (2000)  1 Les Armateurs (2003)  1 Django (2003)  1 Fox (2009)  1 Nickelodeon (2011)  1 Weta Digital (2011)  1 DreamWorks (2012)  2 Cartoon Saloon (2014-2020) || 8 Pixar (2003–2020)  2 Sony Pictures (2018-2021)  2 Warner Bros. (1999-2014)  2 Aardman (2000–2005)  2 DreamWorks (2001–2005)  2 Nickelodeon (2011)  2 Disney (2012–2013)  1 Fox (1997)  1 Ghibli (2002)  1 ImageMovers (2006)  1 Weta (2011)   || 10 Pixar (1998-2019)  3 DreamWorks (1998-2005)  2 Sony Pictures (2018-2021)  2 Aardman (2000–2005)  3 Disney (2012–2021)  1 Ghibli (2002)  1 Nickelodeon (2011)  1 Animal Logic (2014)  1 Warner Bros. (2014)       || 11 Pixar (2003–2020)  1 Laika (2016)  2 DreamWorks (2001–2014)  2 Ghibli (2002–2013)  1 Aardman (2000)  1 Burton (2005)  1 Nickelodeon (2011)  1 Disney (2012)         || 10 Pixar (2003–2020)  2 DreamWorks (2001–2005)  2 Ghibli (2002–2013)  1 Aardman (2005)  1 Thousand Words (2006)  1 Nickelodeon (2011)  1 Laika (2012)  1 Animal Logic (2014)  1 Warner Bros. (2014)  2 Sony Pictures (2018-2021)   || 11 Pixar (2003–2020)  2 DreamWorks (2001–2005)  3 Disney (2013–2021)  1 Ghibli (2002)  1 Aardman (2005)  1 Animal Logic (2006)  1 Nickelodeon (2011)  1 Sony Pictures (2018)       || 10 Pixar (2003–2019)  3 DreamWorks (2004–2014)  1 Ghibli (2005)  1 Nickelodeon (2011)  1 Disney (2016)             || 6 Pixar (2006–2021)  2 DreamWorks (2004–2007)  2 Illumination (2013–2015)  1 Disney (2012)               || 3 DreamWorks (2005–2011)  5 Disney (2012–2021)  3 Pixar (2007–2020)  1 Animal Logic (2006)  1 Illumination (2010)  1 Sony Pictures (2015)           || 9 Pixar (2006–2020)  3 Disney (2012–2021)  1 Nickelodeon (2011)  1 Weta (2011)  1 Aardman (2005)  1 DreamWorks (2005)  1 Sony Pictures (2018) 1 Animal Logic (2014)  1 Warner Bros. (2014)       || 9 Pixar (2007–2020)  1 Nickelodeon (2011)  1 Weta (2011)  2 Disney (2013-2021)  1 DreamWorks (2014)  1 Sony Pictures (2018)           || 4 Pixar (2009–2020)  2 Sony Pictures (2018-2021)  1 Nickelodeon (2011)  1 Laika (2012)  1 Ghibli (2013)  1 Animal Logic (2014)  1 Warner Bros. (2014)           || 6 Pixar (2009–2020)  1 Nickelodeon (2011)  2 Disney (2013-2021)  1 Sony Pictures (2018)  1 Animal Logic (2014)  1 Warner Bros. (2014)             || 2 Pixar (2017–2019)  1 Disney (2016)  1 Cartoon Saloon (2020)  1 Sony Pictures (2018)  1 Sun Creature Studio (2022)

State-wide associations

|-

|-
! Los Angeles Critics || Dallas-Fort Worth Critics || Florida Critics || New York Critics || Washington D.C. Area Critics || San Diego Critics || Toronto Critics || St. Louis Gateway Critics || Austin Critics || Chicago Critics || Houston Critics || Boston Critics || San Francisco Critics || Denver Critics || Detroit Film Critics Society
|-
| The Little Mermaid
|-
| The Rescuers Down Under || The Rescuers Down Under
|-
| Beauty and the Beast || Beauty and the Beast
|-
| Aladdin || Aladdin
|-
| || The Nightmare Before Christmas
|-
| The Lion King || The Lion King
|-
| Toy Story || Toy Story
|-
| || James and the Giant Peach
|-
| Hercules || Anastasia
|-
| A Bug's Life || The Prince of Egypt
|-
| The Iron Giant || The Iron Giant || The Iron Giant || South Park + The Iron Giant 
|- 
| Chicken Run || Chicken Run || Chicken Run || Chicken Run 
|-
| Shrek || Shrek || Shrek || Waking Life
|-
| Spirited Away || Spirited Away || Spirited Away || Spirited Away || Lilo & Stitch
|-
| The Triplets of Belleville || Finding Nemo || Finding Nemo || The Triplets of Belleville || Finding Nemo || The Triplets of Belleville || Finding Nemo
|-
| The Incredibles || The Incredibles || The Incredibles || The Incredibles || The Incredibles || The Incredibles || The Triplets of Belleville || The Incredibles
|-
| The Curse of the Were-Rabbit || The Curse of the Were-Rabbit || The Curse of the Were-Rabbit || Howl's Moving Castle || The Curse of the Were-Rabbit || Howl's Moving Castle || The Curse of the Were-Rabbit || || Sin City
|-
| Happy Feet || Happy Feet || Monster House || Happy Feet || Happy Feet || Cars || Happy Feet || Cars || Cars
|-
| Persepolis + Ratatouille || Ratatouille || Ratatouille || Persepolis || Ratatouille || Ratatouille || Ratatouille || Ratatouille || Ratatouille || Ratatouille || Ratatouille
|-
| Waltz with Bashir || Wall·E || Wall·E || Wall·E || Wall·E || Wall·E || Wall·E || Wall·E || Wall·E || Wall·E || Wall·E
|-
| Fantastic Mr. Fox || Up || Up || Fantastic Mr. Fox || Up || Up || Fantastic Mr. Fox || Up || Up || Up || Up || Up || Coraline
|-
| Toy Story 3 || Toy Story 3 || Toy Story 3 || The Illusionist || Toy Story 3 || Toy Story 3 || How to Train Your Dragon || Toy Story 3 || Toy Story 3 || Toy Story 3 || Toy Story 3 || Toy Story 3 || Toy Story 3 || Toy Story 3
|-
| Rango || Rango || The Secret of the Unicorn || Rango || Rango || Arthur Christmas || The Secret of the Unicorn || The Secret of the Unicorn || Rango || Rango || Rango || Rango || Rango || Rango
|-
| Frankenweenie || ParaNorman || Frankenweenie || Frankenweenie || ParaNorman || ParaNorman || ParaNorman || Wreck-It Ralph || Wreck-It Ralph || ParaNorman || Wreck-It Ralph || Frankenweenie || ParaNorman || ParaNorman
|-
| Ernest & Celestine || Frozen || Frozen || The Wind Rises || Frozen || The Wind Rises || The Wind Rises || Frozen || Frozen || The Wind Rises || Frozen || The Wind Rises || Frozen || Frozen
|-
| The Tale of the Princess Kaguya || The Lego Movie || The Lego Movie || The Lego Movie || The Lego Movie || The Boxtrolls || The Tale of the Princess Kaguya || The Lego Movie || The Lego Movie || The Lego Movie || The Lego Movie || The Tale of the Princess Kaguya || The Lego Movie || The Lego Movie
|-
| Anomalisa || Inside Out || Inside Out || Inside Out || Inside Out || Anomalisa || Shaun the Sheep Movie || Inside Out || Inside Out || Inside Out || Inside Out || Anomalisa + Inside Out || Anomalisa || Inside Out
|-
| Your Name || Zootopia || Kubo and the Two Strings || Zootopia || Kubo and the Two Strings || Kubo and the Two Strings || Zootopia || Zootopia || Kubo and the Two Strings || Kubo and the Two Strings || Kubo and the Two Strings || Tower || The Red Turtle || Zootopia
|-
| The Breadwinner || Coco || Coco || Coco || Coco || My Life as a Zucchini || The Breadwinner || Coco || Coco || Coco || Coco || Coco || Coco || Coco || The Lego Batman Movie
|-
| Spider-Man: Into the Spider-Verse || Isle of Dogs || Mirai || Spider-Man: Into the Spider-Verse || Isle of Dogs || Isle of Dogs || Isle of Dogs || Spider-Man: Into the Spider-Verse || Spider-Man: Into the Spider-Verse || Spider-Man: Into the Spider-Verse || Isle of Dogs || Isle of Dogs || Spider-Man: Into the Spider-Verse || Spider-Man: Into the Spider-Verse || Spider-Man: Into the Spider-Verse
|-
| I Lost My Body || Toy Story 4 || I Lost My Body || I Lost My Body || Toy Story 4 || I Lost My Body || Missing Link || Toy Story 4 || I Lost My Body || Toy Story 4 || Toy Story 4 || I Lost My Body || I Lost My Body || Toy Story 4 || Toy Story 4 
|-
| Wolfwalkers || Soul || Soul || Wolfwalkers || Soul || Wolfwalkers || Wolfwalkers || Soul || Wolfwalkers || Wolfwalkers || Soul || The Wolf House || Soul || Soul || Soul
|-
| Flee || Encanto || Encanto || The Mitchells vs. the Machines || The Mitchells vs. the Machines || Luca || Flee || The Mitchells vs. the Machines || The Mitchells vs. the Machines || Flee || The Mitchells vs. the Machines || Flee || Encanto || Flee || The Mitchells vs. the Machines
|-
| Pinocchio || Pinocchio || Turning Red ||  Marcel the Shell with Shoes On || Pinocchio || Pinocchio ||Turning Red ||   Marcel the Shell with Shoes On  ||  Marcel the Shell with Shoes On ||Pinocchio || Pinocchio || Turning Red || Pinocchio ||  Pinocchio || 
|-
! colspan=15|Number of awards by animation studio
|-
! Los Angeles Critics || Dallas-Fort Worth Critics || Florida Critics || New York Critics || Washington D.C. Area Critics || San Diego Critics || Toronto Critics || St. Louis Gateway Critics || Austin Critics || Chicago Critics || Houston Critics || Boston Critics || San Francisco Critics || Denver Critics || Detroit Film Critics Society
|-
| 6 Disney (1989-1997)  5 Pixar (1995-2010)  2 Aardman (2000–2005)  2 DreamWorks (2001–2005)  2 Ghibli (2002–2014)  2 Les Armateurs (2003–2013)  1 Warner Bros. (1999)  1 Django (2003)  1 Animal Logic (2006)  1 Je Suis Bien Content (2007)  1 Bridget Folman (2008)  1 Fox (2009)  1 Nickelodeon (2011)  1 Burton (2012)  1 Starburns (2015)  1 Sony Pictures (2018) 1 Cartoon Saloon (2020)  1 Sun Creature Studio (2022) || 11 Pixar (1995-2020)  7 Disney (1990-2021)  3 DreamWorks (1998-2005)  2 Skellington (1993–1996)  2 Warner Bros. (1999-2014)  2 Aardman (2000–2005)  2 Animal Logic (2006–2014)  1 Fox (1997)  1 Ghibli (2002)  1 Nickelodeon (2011)  1 Laika (2012)         || 12 Pixar (2003–2022)  2 Warner Bros. (1999-2014)  2 Aardman (2001–2005)  2 DreamWorks (2001–2005)  1 Ghibli (2002)  1 ImageMovers (2006)  1 Nickelodeon (2011)  1 Weta (2011)  1 Burton (2012)  2 Disney (2013-2021)  1 Animal Logic (2014)         || 3 Ghibli (2002–2013)  4 Pixar (2004–2017)  2 Warner Bros. (2000–2014)  2 Sony Pictures (2018-2021)  2 Django (2003–2010)  2 Animal Logic (2006–2014)  1 Comedy Central (1999)  1 Aardman (2000)  1 Thousand Words (2001)  1 Les Armateurs (2003)  1 Je Suis Bien Content (2007)  1 Fox (2009)  1 Cartoon Saloon (2020)  1 Burton (2012)       || 10 Pixar (2003–2020)  2 Disney (2002–2013)  2 Animal Logic (2006–2014)  1 Aardman (2005)  1 DreamWorks (2005)  1 Nickelodeon (2011)  1 Laika (2012)  1 Warner Bros. (2014)               || 7 Pixar (2004–2021)  2 Ghibli (2005–2013)  2 Laika (2012–2014)  1 Les Armateurs (2003)  1 Django (2003)  1 Xilam (2019)  1 Aardman (2011)  1 Cartoon Saloon (2020) 1 Sony Pictures (2011)  1 Starburns (2015)               || 3 Pixar (2003–2008)  2 DreamWorks (2005–2010)  2 Aardman (2005–2015)  2 Ghibli (2013–2014)  1 Les Armateurs (2004)  1 Django (2004)  1 Animal Logic (2006)  1 Fox (2009)  1 Nickelodeon (2011)  1 Weta (2011)  2 Laika (2012–2019)  1 Cartoon Saloon (2020) 1 Sun Creature Studio (2022)     || 10 Pixar (2004–2020)  2 Disney (2012–2013) 2 Sony Pictures (2018-2021)  1 Nickelodeon (2011)  1 Weta (2011)  1 Animal Logic (2014)  1 Warner Bros. (2014)                   || 8 Pixar (2006–2017)  2 Disney (2012–2013) 2 Sony Pictures (2018-2021)  1 Hybride (2005)   1 Nickelodeon (2011)  1 Laika (2016)  1 Animal Logic (2014) 1 Cartoon Saloon (2020)  1 Xilam (2019)  1 Warner Bros. (2014)                   || 7 Pixar (2007–2019)  1 Nickelodeon (2011)  2 Laika (2012–2016)  1 Ghibli (2013)  1 Animal Logic (2014)  1 Warner Bros. (2014)  1 Cartoon Saloon (2020)  1 Sun Creature Studio (2022)               || 8 Pixar (2007–2020)  2 Disney (2012–2013)  1 Nickelodeon (2011) 1 Laika (2016)  1 Animal Logic (2014)  1 Warner Bros. (2014)  1 Sony Pictures (2021)                   || 6 Pixar (2008–2022)  2 Ghibli (2013–2014)  1 Xilam (2019)  1 Nickelodeon (2011)  1 Burton (2012)  1 Starburns (2015)  1 Sun Creature Studio (2022)                   || 2 Laika (2009–2012)  3 Pixar (2010-2020)  1 Nickelodeon (2011)  2 Disney (2013-2021)  1 Animal Logic (2014)  1 Xilam (2019)  1 Warner Bros. (2014) 1 Sony Pictures (2018)  1 Starburns (2015)                 || 5 Pixar (2010–2020) 1 Sony Pictures (2018)  1 Nickelodeon (2011)  1 Laika (2012)  2 Disney (2013-2016)  1 Animal Logic (2014)  1 Warner Bros. (2014)  1 Sun Creature Studio (2022)               || 1 Warner Bros. (2017)  2 Sony Pictures (2018-2021)  2 Pixar (2019-2020)

United Kingdom

|-

|-
! BAFTA Awards
|-
| Happy Feet
|-
| Ratatouille
|-
| WALL-E
|-
| Up
|-
| Toy Story 3
|-
| Rango
|-
| Brave
|-
| Frozen
|-
| The Lego Movie
|-
| Inside Out
|-
| Kubo and the Two Strings
|-
| Coco
|-
| Spider-Man: Into the Spider-Verse
|-
| Klaus
|-
| Soul
|-
| Encanto
|-
| Pinocchio
|-
! colspan=1|Number of awards by animation studio
|-
! BAFTA Awards
|-
| 1 Animal Logic (2006)  8 Pixar (2007–2020)  1 Nickelodeon (2011)  2 Disney (2013-2021)  1 Warner Bros. (2014)  1 Sony Pictures (2018)  2 Netflix Animation (2019-2022)

Europe

|-

|-
! European Film Awards || Goya Awards || César Awards
|-
| || Town Musicians of Bremen
|-
| || The Return of the North Wind
|-
| || Megasónicos
|-
| || ¡Qué vecinos tan animales!
|-
| || Goomer 
|-
| || The Island of the Crab
|-
| || The Living Forest
|-
| || Dragon Hill
|-
| || El Cid: The Legend
|-
| || Pinocchio 3000
|-
| || Midsummer Dream
|-
| || Pérez, el ratoncito de tus sueños
|- 
| || Nocturna
|-
| Mia and the Migoo || The Missing Lynx
|-
| The Illusionist || Planet 51 
|-
| Chico and Rita || Chico & Rita || The Illusionist
|-
| Alois Nebel || Wrinkles || The Rabbi's Cat
|-
| The Congress || Tad, the Lost Explorer || Ernest & Celestine
|-
| The Art of Happiness || Underdogs || Loulou, l'incroyable secret
|-
| Song of the Sea || Mortadelo and Filemon: Mission Implausible || Minuscule: Valley of the Lost Ants
|-
|  || Capture the Flag || The Little Prince
|-
| My Life as a Courgette || Birdboy: The Forgotten Children || The Little Prince
|-
| Loving Vincent || Tad the Lost Explorer and the Secret of King Midas || My Life as a Courgette 
|-
| Another Day of Life || Another Day of Life || The Big Bad Fox and Other Tales...
|-
| Buñuel in the Labyrinth of the Turtles || Buñuel in the Labyrinth of the Turtles || Dilili in Paris
|-
| Josep || Buñuel in the Labyrinth of the Turtles || I Lost My Body
|-
| Flee || Valentina || Josep
|-
| No Dogs or Italians Allowed || Unicorn Wars || The Summit of the Gods
|-
! colspan=15|Number of awards by producing country
|-
! European Film Awards !! Goya Awards !! César Awards
|-
| 4 France (2008–2014)  2 Italy (2008–2013)  2 Great Britain (2009–10)  2 Germany (2011–2012)  2 Luxembourg (2012–14)  2 Belgium (2012–2014)  1 Spain (2009)  1 Hungary (2009)  1 Philippines (2009)  1 Czech Republic (2011)  1 Israel (2012)  1 Poland (2012)  2 Denmark (2014-2021)  1 Ireland (2014) || 21 Spain (1989-2015)  4 Great Britain (2007–2010)  2 France (2004–2007)  2 Argentina (2006–2013)  1 Canada (2004)  1 Portugal (2005)  1 United States (2009)  1 Hungary (2010)  1 Philippines (2010)           || 6 France (2010–15)  4 Belgium (2012–2020)  1 Great Britain (2010)  2 Luxembourg (2012-2022)  1 Hungary (2013)

France

|-

|-
! Annecy Festival
|-
| Heroic Times
|-
| 
|-
| When the Wind Blows
|-
| 
|-
| Alice
|-
| 
|-
| Robinson & Co.
|-
| 
|-
| Porco Rosso
|-
| 
|-
| Pom Poko
|-
| James and the Giant Peach
|-
| I Married a Strange Person!
|-
| Kirikou and the Sorceress
|-
| 
|-
| Mutant Aliens
|-
| My Beautiful Girl, Mari
|-
| My Life as McDull
|-
| Oseam
|-
| The District!
|-
| Renaissance
|-
| Free Jimmy
|-
| Sita Sings the Blues
|-
| Coraline + Mary and Max
|-
| Fantastic Mr. Fox
|-
| The Rabbi's Cat
|-
| Crulic: The Path to Beyond
|-
| Rio 2096: A Story of Love and Fury
|-
| Boy and the World
|-
|  April and the Extraordinary World
|-
| My Life as a Courgette
|-
| Lu over the Wall
|-
| Funan
|-
| I Lost My Body
|-
| Calamity, a Childhood of Martha Jane Cannary
|- 
| Flee
|-
| Little Nicholas – Happy as Can Be
|-
! Annecy Festival
|-
! colspan=15|Number of awards by producing country
|-
|  2 Hungary (1985-2005)  6 United Kingdom (1987-2021)  10 France (1991-2022)  2 Switzerland (1989-2016)  3 Japan (1993-2017) 7 United States (1997-2021)2 South Korea (2002-2004)1 Australia (2009)1 Hong Kong (2003)1 Czechoslovakia (1989)1 Brazil (2013-2014)1 Canada (2015)3 Belgium (1999-2018)  3 Switzerland (1999-2018)3 Luxembourg (1999-2021)2 Denmark (2020-2021)1 Sweden (2021)2 Norway (2007-2021)1 Romania (2012)1 West Germany (1989)1 Poland (2012)

Australia

|-

|-
! Asia Pacific Screen Awards
|-
| 5 Centimeters Per Second
|-
| Waltz with Bashir
|-
| Mary and Max
|-
| Piercing I 
|-
| Leafie, A Hen into the Wild
|-
| A Letter to Momo
|-
| Ku! Kin-dza-dza
|-
| The Tale of the Princess Kaguya
|-
| Miss Hokusai
|-
| Seoul Station
|-
| Window Horses: The Poetic Persian Epiphany of Rosie Ming
|-
| Rezo
|-
| Weathering with You
|-
| The Nose or the Conspiracy of Mavericks
|-
! Asia Pacific Screen Awards
|-
! colspan=15|Number of awards by producing country
|-
| 5 Japan (2007-2019)  1 France (2008)  1 Australia (2009)  1 Chinese (2010)  2 South Korean (2011-2016)  3 Russia (2013-2021)  1 Germany (2008)  1 Canada (2017)  1 Israel (2008)

Japan

|-
! Mainichi Film Awards || Japan Academy Film Prize
|-
| Kiki's Delivery Service
|-
| Hashire! Shiroi Ōkami
|-
| Roujin Z
|-
| Porco Rosso
|-
| Patlabor 2: The Movie
|-
| Pom Poko
|-
| Junkers Come Here
|-
| Black Jack
|-
| Princess Mononoke
|-
| Doraemon: Nobita's Great Adventure in the South Seas
|-
| Jin-Roh: The Wolf Brigade
|-
| Doraemon: A Grandmother's Recollections
|-
| Spirited Away
|-
| Crayon Shin-chan: The Storm Called: The Battle of the Warring States
|-
| Tokyo Godfathers
|-
| The Place Promised in Our Early Days
|-
| Fullmetal Alchemist the Movie: Conqueror of Shamballa
|-
| The Girl Who Leapt Through Time
|-
| Summer Days with Coo || The Girl Who Leapt Through Time
|-
| The Sky Crawlers || Tekkon Kinkreet
|-
| Summer Wars || Ponyo on the Cliff by the Sea
|-
| Colorful || Summer Wars
|-
| Hotarubi no Mori e || The Secret World of Arrietty
|-
| Wolf Children || From up on Poppy Hill
|-
| The Tale of the Princess Kaguya || Wolf Children
|-
| Giovanni's Island || The Wind Rises
|-
| Miss Hokusai || Stand by Me Doraemon
|-
| Your Name || The Boy and the Beast
|-
| Complex × Complex || In This Corner of the World
|-
| Okko's Inn || Night Is Short, Walk On Girl
|-
| Children of the Sea || Mirai
|-
| Looking for Magical Doremi || Weathering with You
|-
| The House of the Lost on the Cape || Demon Slayer: Kimetsu no Yaiba – The Movie: Mugen Train
|-
| Takano Intersection || Evangelion: 3.0+1.0 Thrice Upon a Time
|-
! colspan=15|Number of awards by animation studio
|-
! Mainichi Film Awards || Japan Academy Film Prize
|-
|  6 Studio Ghibli (1989-2013)  1 Group TAC (1990)  1 Tokyo Theaters Co. (1991)  5 Production I.G (1993-2015)  1 Triangle Staff (1995)  1 Tezuka Productions (1996)  4 Shin-Ei Animation (1998-2007)  4 Madhouse (2003-2018)  2 CoMix Wave Films (2004-2016)  1 Ascension (2010)  1 Brain's Base (2011)  1 Studio Chizu (2012)   1 Panpokopina (2017)  1 DLE (2018)  1 Studio 4°C (2019)  1 Toei Animation (2020)  1 Aniplex (2021) || 2 Madhouse (2006-2009)  1 Studio 4°C (2006)  4 Studio Ghibli (2008-2013)  3 Studio Chizu (2012-2018)  1 Shin-Ei Animation (2014)  1 MAPPA (2016)  1 Science Saru (2017)  1 CoMix Wave Films (2019)  1 Ufotable (2020)  1 Studio Khara (2021)

Ibero-America

|-
! Platino Awards
|-
| Underdogs
|-
| Boy and the World
|-
| Capture the Flag
|-
| Birdboy: The Forgotten Children
|-
| Tad Jones: The Hero Returns
|-
| Another Day of Life
|-
| Buñuel in the Labyrinth of the Turtles
|-
| Turu, the Wacky Hen
|-
| Ainbo: Spirit of the Amazon
|-
! colspan=15|Number of awards by producing country
|-
! Platino Awards
|-
| 7 Spain (2014-2021)  3 Argentina (2014-2021)  1 Brazil (2015)  1 Peru (2022)

India

|-
! National Film Awards
|-
| Kittu
|-
| Inimey Nangathan
|-
| Roadside Romeo
|-
| Delhi Safari
|-
| Mahayoddha Rama
|-
! colspan=1|Number of awards by animation studio
|-
! National Film Awards
|-
| 1 Bhargava Pictures (2006)1 Mayabimbham Media P Ltd (2007)1 Yash Raj Films (2008)1 Krayon Pictures (2012)1 Contiloe Entertainment (2016)

China

|-
! Hundred Flowers Awards
|-
| Baby Tadpoles Look for Their Mother
|-
| The Monkey King
|-
| 	Prince Nezha's Triumph Against Dragon King
|- 
! colspan=1|Number of awards by animation studio
|-
! Hundred Flowers Awards
|-
| 3 Shanghai Animation Film Studio (1962-1980)

Other

|-
! Annie Awards
|-
| Boy and the World
|-
| The Red Turtle
|-
| The Breadwinner
|-
| Mirai
|-
| I Lost My Body
|-
| Wolfwalkers
|-
| Flee
|-
| Marcel the Shell with Shoes On
|-
! colspan=15|Number of awards by animation studio
|-
! Annie Awards
|-
| 1 Filme de Papel (2015)1 Studio Ghibli (2015)1 Melusine Productions (2017)1 Studio Chizu (2018)2 Cartoon Saloon (2016-2020)1 Xilam (2019)2 GKIDS (2015-2020)1 Final Cut for Real (2021)1 Sun Creature Studio (2021)1 A24 (2022)

References

 Feature films awards
Film-related lists